Austroharpa learorum is a species of sea snail, a marine gastropod mollusk in the family Harpidae, the harp snails.

Description

The snails have a large conch-shaped shell, cream in colour, and typically with orange flecks.

Distribution

The snails are largely found in Southern Australia, especially on the southerly coast of Western Australia.

References

External links

learorum
Gastropods described in 1998
Gastropods of Australia